South Korean girl group CLC have released one single album, ten extended plays, and fourteen singles since their debut in 2015.

0-9

B

C

D

E

F

G

H

I

L

M

N

O

P

R

S

T

W

Y

Other songs

See also 
 CLC discography

References

S
CLC